Ljubomir Čelebić (born 15 September 1991) is a Montenegrin tennis player.

Čelebić has a career high ATP singles ranking of 437 achieved on 31 July 2017. He also has a career high ATP doubles ranking of 667, achieved on 19 June 2017. Čelebić has won 2 ITF singles title and 6 ITF doubles titles.
 
Čelebić has represented Montenegro at Davis Cup, where he has a win–loss record of 33–12.

Future and Challenger finals

Singles: 6 (2–4)

Doubles 14 (6–8)

External links 
 
 
 

1991 births
Living people
Montenegrin male tennis players
Sportspeople from Podgorica